This is a list of the main career statistics of professional Canadian tennis player, Eugenie Bouchard. To date, Bouchard has won one WTA singles title at the 2014 Nuremberg Cup. Other highlights of Bouchard's career thus far include a runner-up finish at the 2014 Wimbledon Championships, semifinal appearances at the 2014 Australian Open and 2014 French Open and a quarterfinal run at the 2015 Australian Open. Bouchard achieved a career high singles ranking of world No. 5 on October 20, 2014.

Career achievements

Bouchard advanced to her first career singles final at the 2013 HP Open following a straight sets victory over Kurumi Nara, but lost to former US Open champion Samantha Stosur in three sets in the championship match. The following year, Bouchard reached her first Grand Slam semifinal at the Australian Open, defeating former world No. 1 Ana Ivanovic (who had upset the reigning world No. 1 and heavy favourite, Serena Williams) en route before losing in straight sets to the eventual champion, Li Na. During the clay court season, Bouchard won her first WTA singles title at the Nuremberg Cup, defeating Karolína Plíšková in the final in three sets before reaching her second consecutive major semifinal at the French Open, where she lost in three sets to the eventual champion, Maria Sharapova. In July, Bouchard became the first Canadian player to reach a Grand Slam final in singles when she defeated world No. 3, Simona Halep, in the semifinals of the Wimbledon Championships. However, she lost in the final to sixth seed and 2011 champion, Petra Kvitová. In September, Bouchard reached her first WTA Premier 5 final at the Wuhan Open, but was again defeated by Kvitová.

Performance timelines

Singles
Current after the 2023 Australian Open qualifying.

Notes
 Bouchard's 2015 US Open withdrawal in the fourth round does not count as a loss.
 The first Premier 5 event of the year has switched back and forth between the Qatar Ladies Open and the Dubai Tennis Championships since 2009. Dubai was classified as a Premier 5 event from 2009–2011 before being succeeded by Doha for the 2012–2014 period. Since 2015, the two tournaments alternate between Premier 5 and Premier status every year.
 In 2014, the Pan Pacific Open was downgraded to a Premier event and replaced by the Wuhan Open.
 Only WTA Tour main draw (incl. major tournaments) and Olympics results are considered.

Doubles

Mixed doubles

Grand Slam finals

Singles: 1 (runner-up)

Other significant finals

WTA Premier Mandatory & Premier 5 finals

Singles: 1 (runner-up)

WTA career finals

Singles: 8 (1 title, 7 runner-ups)

Doubles: 5 (1 title, 4 runner-ups)

ITF Circuit finals

Singles: 7 (6 titles, 1 runner-up)

Doubles: 4 (1 title, 3 runner-ups)

Junior Grand Slam finals

Singles: 1 (title)

Doubles: 2 (2 titles)

Singles Grand Slam seedings
The tournaments won by Bouchard are in boldface, while italics indicates Bouchard was the runner-up.

Coaches

Career prize money

*as of January 29, 2018

Head-to-head records

Record against career-high top-10 players
Bouchard's record against players who have been ranked in the top 10. Active players are in boldface.

Wins over top-10 opponents
Bouchard has a 12–29 (29%) record against players who were, at the time the match was played, ranked in the top 10.

References

Bouchard, Eugenie